Ferrante & Teicher were a duo of American pianists, known for their light arrangements of familiar classical pieces, movie soundtracks, and show tunes as well as their signature style of florid, intricate, and fast-paced piano playing performances.

Career
Arthur Ferrante (September 7, 1921, New York City – September 19, 2009), and Louis Teicher (August 24, 1924, Wilkes-Barre, Pennsylvania – August 3, 2008, Highlands, North Carolina) met while studying at the Juilliard School of Music in New York in 1930. Musical prodigies, they began performing as a piano duo while still in school. After graduating, they joined the Juilliard faculty.

In 1947, they launched a full-time concert career, at first playing nightclubs, then quickly moving up to playing classical music with orchestral backing. Steven Tyler of Aerosmith relates the story that in the 1950s the two students practiced in the home of his grandmother Constance Neidhart Tallarico. Between 1950 and 1980, they were a major American "easy listening" act and scored four big U.S. hits: "Theme from The Apartment" (Pop #10), "Theme from Exodus" (Pop #2), "Tonight" (Pop #8), and "Midnight Cowboy" (Pop #10). They performed and recorded regularly with pops orchestras popular standards by George Gershwin, Jerome Kern, Cole Porter, Richard Rodgers, the Sherman Brothers and others. In 1973, they did the Hollywood Radio Theater theme for the Rod Serling radio drama series, The Zero Hour.

The duo also experimented with prepared pianos, adding paper, sticks, rubber, wood blocks, metal bars, chains, glass, mallets, and other found objects to piano string beds. In this way they were able to produce a variety of bizarre sounds that sometimes resembled percussion instruments and at other times resulted in special effects that sounded as if they were electronically synthesized.

Both men were initiated as honorary members of Tau Kappa Epsilon  at Central State University (now University of Central Oklahoma) while on tour.

Ferrante and Teicher ceased performing in 1989 and retired to Longboat Key and Siesta Key, respectively, close to each other on the west coast of Florida. They continued to play together occasionally at a local piano store.

CDs of their music, some of it not previously released, have continued to appear.

Louis Teicher died of a heart attack in August 2008, three weeks before his 84th birthday. Arthur Ferrante died of natural causes on September 19, 2009, twelve days after his 88th birthday; he had once said he wanted to live one year for each piano key. Arthur was survived by his wife, Jena; his daughter, Brenda Eberhardt; and two granddaughters.

Discography

Albums

1950s

 Mississippi Boogie/African Echoes (1952)  Joe Davis Records
 Piano Playhouse (1952) MGM E209
 Hi-Fireworks (1953) Columbia CL-573
 Can-Can & Me & Juliet (1954) Columbia CL-6264
 Continental Holiday (1954) Columbia CL-6291
 Xmas Hi-Fivories (1954) Westminster WL-3044
 Rhapsody (1955) Urania URA-78011
 Rachmaninoff Two-Piano Suites (1955) Westminster XWN-18059
 Original Variations for Two Pianos (1955) Westminster XWN-18169
 Ravel/Debussy (1955) Westminster XWN-18219
 Encores! (1955) Westminster XWN-18786
 Postcards from Paris (1955) Westminster WP-6001
 Adventure in Carols (1955) Westminster WP-6021
 Soundblast (1956) Westminster WP-6041 (Re-released as Soundproof WPS-107 using the 1958 Soundproof cover)
 Heavenly Sounds in Hi-Fi (1957) ABC ABCS-221 (Re-released in 1966 under the title Heavenly Sounds of Ferrante & Teicher, ABCS-555)
 Soundproof (1958) Westminster WP-6014
 Ferrante & Teicher with Percussion (1958) ABCS-248 (Re-released in 1966 under the title Temptation, ABCS-561)
 Blast Off (1959) ABCS-285 (Overdubbed with strings and re-released in 1966 under the title We've Got Rhythm, ABCS-556)
 Play Light Classics (1959) ABCS-313
 Themes from Broadway Shows (1959) ABCS-336

1960s

 Dream Concerto (1960) UAS-6103
 Dynamic Twin Pianos (1960) WWS-8504
 The World's Greatest Themes (1960) UAS-6121
 Latin Pianos (1960) UAS-6135
 Golden Piano Hits (1961) WWS-8505
 Broadway to Hollywood (1961) Columbia CS 8407
 Goodbye Again OST (1961) UAS-5091
 Love Themes (1961) WWS-8514
 West Side Story (1961) UAS-6166
 Tonight! (1961) UAS-6171
 Golden Themes from Motion Pictures (1962) UAS-6210
 Pianos in Paradise (1962) UAS-6230
 Snowbound (1962) UAS-6233
 The Keys to Her Apartment (1962) UAS-6247
 Love Themes From Cleopatra (1963) UAS-6290
 Holiday for Pianos (1963) UAS-6298
 Concert for Lovers (1963) UAS-6315
 Exotic Love themes (1963) UAS-6340
 Fifty Fabulous Favorites (1964)UAS-6343
 My Fair Lady (1964) UAS-6361
 The Enchanted World of Ferrante & Teicher (1964) UAS-6375
 The People's Choice (1964) UAS-6385
 Springtime (1964) UAS-6406
 By Popular Demand (1965) UAS-6416
 Only the Best (1965) UAS-6434
 A Rage to Live OST (1965) UAS-5130
 The Ferrante & Teicher Concert—Part 1 (1965) UAS-6444
 The Ferrante & Teicher Concert—Part 2 (1965) UAS-6475
 For Lovers of All Ages (1966) UAS-6483
 You Asked For It!(1966) UAS-6526
 We Wish You a Merry Christmas (1966) UAS-6536
 The Twin Piano Magic Volume 2 (1966) ABC-Paramount 559
 The Piano Artistry (1967) S 21004 - Unart (Canada)
 Our Golden Favorites (1967) UAS-6556
 A Man & a Woman (1967) UAS-6572
 In the Heat of the Night (1967) UAS-6624
 Live for Life (1967) UAS-6632
 The Painted Desert (1968) UAS-6636
 A Bouquet of Hits (1968) UAS-6659
 Love in the Generation Gap (1968) UAS-6671
 Listen to the Movies with Ferrante & Teicher (1969) UAS-6701
 Midnight Cowboy (1969) UAS-6725

1970s

 Getting Together (1970) UAS-5501
 Love Is a Soft Touch (1970) UAS-6771
 The Best of Ferrante & Teicher (1970) UAS-73
 The Music Lovers (1971) UAS-6792
 It's Too Late (1971) UAS-5531
 Fiddler on the Roof (1972) UAS-5552
 Play the Hit Themes (1972) UAS-5588
 Salute Nashville (1972) UAS-5645
 Hear and Now (1973) UA-LA018F
 The Roaring Twenties (1973) UA-LA072F
 Killing Me Softly (1974) UA-LA118F
 Dial "M" for Music (1974) UA-LA195F
 The Very Best of Ferrante & Teicher (1974) UA-LA379E
 Greatest Love Themes of the 20th Century (1975) UA-LA101-G2
 In a Soulful Mood (1975) UA-LA227G
 Beautiful, Beautiful (1975) UA-LA316G
 Body & Soul (1975) UA-LA360G
 The Carpenters Songbook (1976) UA-LA490G
 Fill the World With Love (1976) UA-LA547G
 Spirit of 76" (1976) UA-LA573G
 Piano Portraits (1977) UA-LA585G
 Feelings (1977) UA-LA662G
 Rocky & Other Knockouts (1977) UA-LA782G
 Star Wars (1978) UA-LA855G
 You Light Up My Life (1978) UA-LA908G
 Supermen (1979) UA-LA941G
 Classical Disco (1979) UA-LA980G

1980s

 30th Anniversary—On Stage (1984) Avant-Garde (Bainbridge) AVG-1001
 A Few of Our Favorites—On Stage (1985) Avant-Garde (Bainbridge) AVG-1002
 American Fantasy—On Stage (1986) Avant-Garde (Bainbridge) AVG-1003
 Dos Amigos (1988) Avant-Garde (Bainbridge) AVG-1004

1990s

 40th Anniversary—On Stage (1992) Avant-Garde (Intersound) AVG-1005
 All-Time Great Motion Picture Themes (1993) 0777-7-98823-2
 The Ernie Kovacs Record Collection (1997) Varèse Sarabande – VSD-5789
 The Ferrante & Teicher Collection (1998) Avant-Garde (Varèse Sarabande Vintage) AVG-1006

2000s

 The Sound of Music (2000) Avant-Garde/Varèse Sarabande Records AVG-1007
 Denizens of the Deep (2001) Avant-Garde /Varèse Sarabande Records 302 066 261 2
 Can-Can and Me & Juliet/Continental Holiday (2001) Sony/Collectables Records CDL-CD-6692
 Christmas Is So Special (2000) 724352905720
 Great 1970's Motion Picture Themes (2001) 72435-30518-2
 America Forever (2002) Avant-Garde/Varèse Sarabande Records 302 066 312 2

Singles

Track appearances

 Filme, Die Man Nicht Vergisst, United Artists Records
 Great Motion Picture Themes, United Artists Records, 1960
 Music to Read James Bond By, United Artists Records, 1965
 Music to Read James Bond By Vol. 2, United Artists Records, 1965 	 	
 Dusty Fingers Volume One, "Lady Love", Strictly Breaks Records, 1997
 Ultra-Lounge—Christmas Cocktails Part Two, Capitol Records, 1997
 Ultra-Lounge Vol. 16—Mondo Hollywood, Capitol Records, 1997
 The Best of Blue Juice, Blue Note, 2001
 Hard to Find Orchestral Instrumentals II, Eric Records, 2003

References

External links
 Official site
 Ferrante & Teicher discography with album covers and track details
 [ Ferrante & Teicher biography at AllMusic.com]
 Ferrante & Teicher discography

Easy listening musicians
Classical piano duos
American classical pianists
Entertainer duos
American musical duos
ABC Records artists
United Artists Records artists
Musical groups established in 1947
1947 establishments in New York (state)